Luca Mosca (born Milan, 29 May 1957) is an Italian composer. He is best known for his 2007 opera Signor Goldoni.

References

Living people
1957 births